Steph-Nora Okere  (born 26 April 1974) is a Nigerian actress and scriptwriter who was awarded the Special Recognition Award at the City People Entertainment Awards in 2016. In 2015, she became the Vice President of the Script Writers Guild of Nigeria (SWGN).

Early life and education
Okere was born in Owerri which is Imo State's capital, a southeastern geographical area of Nigeria occupied mainly by the Igbo people. At a young age she migrated to Lagos state in southwest Nigeria and received her basic education in St Paul Primary School located in Ebute Metta where she obtained her First School Leaving Certificate. Okere moved back to her state of origin to receive secondary education. Okere obtained her West African Senior School Certificate in Akwakuma Secondary School located in Imo State. Okere obtained her BSc degree in Theatre Arts from the University of Ife.

Career
Okere before her debut into the Nigerian movie industry known commonly as Nollywood was a stage actress and debuted for the first time in the Nigerian movie Industry in 1994 at the age of 21.

Award
Okere won the Special Recognition Award at City People Entertainment Awards in 2016.

Personal life
Okere has spoken publicly about her admiration for her colleague Jim Iyke. Okere although being Igbo can speak the Yoruba language fluently.

Selected filmography 

African Time (2014)
Big Heart Treasure (2007)
Eleda Teju (2007)
Angels Forever (2006)
Joy of a Mother (2006)
Destiny's Challenge (2005)
Empire (2005)
Fake Angel (2005)
Immoral Act (2005)
Aye Jobele (2005)
Circle Of Tears (2004)
Dark Secret (2004)
Indecent Girl (2004)
Lost Paradise (2004)
Singles & Married (2004)
Aristos (2003)
Bleeding Love (2003)

References

External links

Living people
1974 births
Igbo actresses
Obafemi Awolowo University alumni
Actresses from Imo State
Nigerian film actresses
Nigerian screenwriters
21st-century Nigerian actresses